Theatre Lane (Chinese: 戲院里) is a street in Central, Hong Kong Island, Hong Kong. It was named after the Queen's Theatre, which was located at the southern end of the street from 1924 to 2007.

Notable buildings along the street
The following is a list of notable buildings along Theatre Lane, but their entrances might be located on Pedder Street.

Pedder Building
Wheelock House
LHT Tower, formerly Queen's Theatre

See also
List of streets and roads in Hong Kong

References

Central, Hong Kong
Roads on Hong Kong Island
 Odonyms referring to a building